Steffen Stormo Stegavik (born 30 November 1983) is a Norwegian former handball who played for Nærbø Idrettslag. He is currently coaching Sola HK.

Achievements
Norwegian League:
Winner: 2008, 2012, 2013
Norwegian Cup :
Winner: 2010
Romanian National League:
Winner: 2015
Romanian Cup:
Winner: 2015
EHF Cup Winners' Cup:
Quarterfinalist: 2011

Individual awards
 Norwegian League Top Scorer: 2007, 2008

Personal life
Since July 2013, he is married to Norwegian international handballer, Camilla Herrem.

References

External links

Living people
1983 births
Sportspeople from Trondheim
Norwegian male handball players
Expatriate handball players
Norwegian expatriate sportspeople in Romania